Célestin Harst (1698–1778) was a French Catholic priest, organist and harpsichordist.

He was born in Sélestat, Alsace, and became prior of the Ebersmunster abbey. At some point in life, he was introduced to the French royal court and played for Louis XV.

Harst published some organ pieces and, in 1745, the Recueil de différentes pièces de clavecin. Premier livre, a collection of harpsichord works. His style was influenced by Couperin, Rameau and Scarlatti.

See also
 French baroque harpsichordists

1698 births
1778 deaths
People from Sélestat
French male classical composers
French classical organists
French male organists
French Baroque composers
18th-century classical composers
Composers for harpsichord
18th-century French composers
18th-century French male musicians
17th-century male musicians
Male classical organists